John Stepney may refer to:

Sir John Stepney, 1st Baronet (c. 1581–1624) of the Stepney baronets
Sir John Stepney, 3rd Baronet, Royalist MP
Sir John Stepney, 4th Baronet (c. 1632–c. 1681) of the Stepney baronets
Sir John Stepney, 6th Baronet (1693–1748) of the Stepney baronets
Sir John Stepney, 8th Baronet, MP